Borovë or Borova is a village in the Korçë County, Albania. At the 2015 local government reform it became part of the municipality Kolonjë.

During World War II forces of National Liberation Movement, led by Riza Kodheli fought against a German convoy, which was going to Greece. The Germans responded with the Massacre of Borovë, which occurred in the settlement on civilian population as a reprisal.

Demographics 
The village is inhabited by an Aromanian community.

References

Populated places in Kolonjë, Korçë
Villages in Korçë County
Aromanian settlements in Albania